Tonanitla is one of 125 municipalities in Mexico State in Mexico. It's municipal seat is the town of Santa Maria Tonanitla.  It is a new municipality created in 2003.

Politics

References

Municipalities of the State of Mexico
Populated places in the State of Mexico